Members of the New South Wales Legislative Council who served from 1864 to 1869 were appointed for life by the Governor on the advice of the Premier. This list includes members between the beginning of the 1864–65 colonial election on 22 November 1864 and the beginning of the 1869–70 colonial election on 3 December 1869. The President was Sir Terence Murray.

See also
First Martin ministry (1873–1865)
Fourth Cowper ministry (1865–1866)
Second Martin ministry (1866–1868)
Second Robertson ministry (1868–1870)

Notes

References

 

Members of New South Wales parliaments by term
19th-century Australian politicians